Cody Arthur McMains (born October 4, 1985) is a former American actor. He is best known for playing Mitch Briggs in Not Another Teen Movie and Patch in Thomas & the Magic Railroad.

He appeared as Patch in Thomas & the Magic Railroad, with Alec Baldwin, Peter Fonda and Mara Wilson and as Kirby in Big Bully.

He was featured in the movie Bring It On in 2000. He also appeared in the TV series Monk as Mr. Monk's psychiatrist's son, Troy Kroeger, on two episodes. In addition, Cody played Keith on 10 Things I Hate About You, as well as having roles in 90210 and numerous other TV shows.

Filmography

Film

Television

References

External links

1985 births
Living people
20th-century American male actors
21st-century American male actors
American male film actors
American male television actors
Male actors from Pasadena, California